Puerto Rico Highway 891 (PR-891) is the road that goes to downtown Corozal, Puerto Rico. This road can be seen as the Alt 159, since this road was the PR-159 through the area from the town center.

Major intersections

See also

 List of highways numbered 891

References

External links
 

891
Roads in Corozal, Puerto Rico